The siege of Temesvár (today: Timișoara, Romania) was a siege during the Hungarian Revolution of 1848 between the Austrian Empire and Hungarian Revolutionary Army. The Hungarians unsuccessfully tried to capture the Timișoara Fortress.

The siege ended with the Battle of Temesvár.

References

Sources
Temesvár története
Dr. Csikány Tamás: Várharcok az 1848/49-es magyar szabadságharcban
Temesvár az erdélyi közérdekű adatbázisban

History of Timișoara
Temesvar 1849
Temmesvar 1849
Temesvar
1849 in Hungary